Kumaonis are people from the Kumaon, a region in the Indian Himalayas.

Administration
 
 
 Murli Manohar Joshi
 B. D. Pande
 V. C. Pande
 N.D. Tiwari

Defence forces 

 
 
 Major Rajesh Singh Adhikari, Mahavir Chakra awardee. Hero Battle of Tololing, Kargil war
 Vice Admiral Harish Bisht, PVSM, AVSM, ADC former Flag Officer of the Indian Navy. 
 Lucky Bisht, former Indian spy.
 Bahadur Singh Bohra, Lawanz Operation: 25 Sep 2008, Ashoka Chakra recipient
 Mohan Nath Goswami, Operation : CI & IS Ops, Sep 03, 2015, Ashoka Chakra recipient
 General Bipin Chandra Joshi, 17th Chief of Army Staff (COAS), First Army Chief from Uttarakhand
 Admiral Devendra Kumar Joshi 21st Chief of Naval Staff of the Indian Navy
 Captain Ummed Singh Mahra,Operation : Op Orchid, 6 July 1971, Ashoka Chakra recipient
 Mohan Chand Sharma, Batla House Encounter, 19 September 2008, Ashoka Chakra recipient

Politics

 
 
 Kashi Singh Airy
 Yashpal Arya
 K. C. Singh Baba
 Mohan Singh Bisht 
 Ajay Bhatt
 Ganesh Joshi
 Murli Manohar Joshi, He is a member of the Bharatiya Janata Party (BJP) of which he was the President between 1991 and 1993.
 Puran Chand Joshi, general secretary of the C.P.I. (1935–1947)
 Bhagat Singh Koshyari, governor of Maharashtra, chief minister of Uttarakhand
 Kalu Singh Mahara, freedom fighter, led an anti-British militia in Champawat, during the Indian Rebellion of 1857
 Mahendra Singh Mahra, served as a Member of Parliament, Rajya Sabha from Uttarakhand (April 2012 to April 2018).
 Badri Datt Pandey, He was popularly known as, and remains remembered in the region as, the Kumaon Kesari.
 Govind Ballabh Pant, freedom fighter, considered one of the architects of modern India
 Hargovind Pant
 Ila Pant
 K. C. Pant, former defence minister and vice chairman of the Planning Commission
 Prakash Pant
 Sheila Irene Pant or Ra'ana Liaquat Ali Khan, Pakistan
 Bachi Singh Rawat
 Harish Chandra Singh Rawat, M.P. 7th, 8th, 9th Lok Sabha Almora, 15th Lok Sabha Haridwar, C.M. Uttarakhand
 Pradeep Tamta, M.P.
 N. D. Tiwari, three-time Chief Minister of Uttar Pradesh(1976–77, 1984–85, 1988–89) and also served once as Chief Minister of Uttarakhand (2002–2007)
 Bipin Chandra Tripathi, Founder of Uttarakhand Kranti Dal,A political party which started Uttarakhand movement, led to formation of state.

Judiciary 
 Prafulla Chandra Pant, author and former judge of the Supreme Court of India, and a former member of the National Human Rights Commission of India

Science and humanities

 
 
 Ravindra Singh Bisht, Indian archeologist, Padma Shri recipient.
 J. P. Joshi, archaeologist
 Lal Mani Joshi, Buddhist scholar
 M. C. Joshi, Indian archaeologist who served as Director General of the Archaeological Survey of India (ASI) from 1990 to 1993.
 Pooran Chand Joshi, social anthropologist
 Shri Krishna Joshi, physicist
 Yashodhar Mathpal, archaeologist, painter, curator, Gandhian and Rock art conservationist.
 Janardan Ganpatrao Negi, theoretical geophysicist
 Ghananand Pande, scientist
 M. C. Pant, radiation oncologist
 Nilamber Pant, space pioneer
 Krishna Singh Rawat, surveyor cartographer
 Nain Singh Rawat, C.I.E., first person to survey Tibet
 Dalip Kumar Upreti, lichenologist
 Khadg Singh Valdiya, geologist and environmentalist

Journalism and literature

 
 
 Uma Bhatt
 Namita Gokhale
 Namrata Joshi, Journalist
 Manohar Shyam Joshi
 Manoj Joshi
 Prasoon Joshi, lyricist, poet, advertiser; chief executive offer and chairman of McCann World group India
 Shekhar Joshi
 Shailesh Matiyani
 Mrinal Pande
 Gaura Pant, who wrote under the name Shivani
 Pushpesh Pant, Indian historian and food critic
 Sumitranandan Pant
 Shekhar Pathak, historian
 Girish Tiwari, also known as Girda

Music
 
 
Dev Negi, Bollywood Playback Singer
Pawandeep Rajan, Indian Idol 2020, Season 12 winner
B. K. Samant, folk singer
Mohan Upreti, folk singer, composer of the classic Kumaoni song Bedu Pako Baromasa 
Naima Khan Upreti

Sports 

 
 
Chandraprabha Aitwal, Padma Shri, Arjun awardee, (mountaineer) (Climbed all major peaks in the world) Rung Ratna Awardee. Tenzing Norgay Lifetime Achievement Award.
Kavinder Bisht, boxer
Madhumita Bisht, badminton
Ekta Bisht, cricketer
Unmukt Chand, cricketer
Rohit Danu, footballer 
Deepak Dhapola, cricketer
Lakshya Sen, badminton
MS Dhoni, cricketer (former captain of Indian cricket team, born to Kumaoni parents)
Kamlesh Nagarkoti, cricketer
Mir Ranjan Negi, hockey player
Pawan Negi, cricketer
Manish Pandey, cricketer
Rishabh Pant, cricketer
Harish Chandra Singh Rawat, 1965 Everester, Padma Shree recipient (1965)
Anirudh Thapa football

Films and theatre
 
 

 Sonam Bajwa, Bollywood Actress
 Sapna Awasthi, Bollywood playback singer
 Nidhi Bisht, casting director
 Gopal Datt, actor and writer
 Prasoon Joshi, advertisement guru and lyricist
 Sukirti Kandpal, television actress
 Vinod Kapri, filmmaker
 Dev Negi, singer
 Hemant Pandey, actor
 Nitesh Pandey, actor
 Nirmal Pandey, actor
 Sudhanshu Pandey, actor 
 Sudhir Pandey, actor
 Diksha Panth, Indian film actress
 Disha Patani, actress
 Sunita Rajwar, film, television and stage actress who graduated from the National School of Drama
 B. M. Shah, Sangeet Natak Akademi Award winner
 Mohan Upreti, dramatist
 Naima Khan Upreti, dramatist

Humanitarian

 
 
Dan Singh Bisht, billionaire, philanthropist
Lakshman Singh Jangpangi, former trade agent
Deep Joshi, social activist, recipient of Padma Shri.
Vinayak Lohani, National Award for Child Welfare 2011
Lalit Pande, social worker, Padma Shri recipient 
Kamla Pant, social activist
Ridhima Pandey, activist for action against climate change

Business
 Ranjan Pant, chief executive officer, advisor, global strategy management consultant and a change management expert
 Dan Singh Bisht, billionaire, philanthropist
 Muktesh Pant, former chief executive officer of Yum China.

Spiritual Leaders
 
 
 Baba Hari Dass, yoga master, silent monk, and commentator of Indian scriptural tradition of Dharma and Moksha
 Satyananda Saraswati, Sannyasin, yoga teacher and guru

References

Kumaon division
People from Almora

People from Bageshwar
People from Nainital
People from Pithoragarh
Lists of people from Uttarakhand
People from Haldwani
Kumaonis